Bill & Ted's Bogus Journey: Music from the Motion Picture is the licensed soundtrack to the 1991 Orion Pictures film Bill & Ted's Bogus Journey. It was released by Interscope Records on July 9, 1991 on CD and cassette formats. In Japan it was released on August 25, 1991.

Soundtrack information 
Unlike the soundtrack to the film's predecessor, Bill & Ted's Excellent Adventure, this soundtrack features music from artists well-known at the time of the film's release.  Many of these songs, such as Faith No More's "The Perfect Crime" and Megadeth's "Go To Hell", help paint the darker tone of the film. Many of the contributing artists have a cameo of some form in the film. "Shout it Out" was recorded while Slaughter was on the road during their Stick It Live tour. The Winger track "Battle Stations" was written by front man Kip Winger after reading the script for the film and recorded shortly after the band returned from their first European tour. Neverland's song "Drinking Again" was not used in the film, but was a substitute for another Neverland song "For the Love (of Music)". However the intro from "Drinking Again" was used for a television promo for the film. Both songs were released one month prior on Neverland's self-titled debut album. The version of "God Gave Rock 'n Roll to You II" is not that which plays at the film's end as it lacks the intro by Steve Vai and the sound of girls chanting the chorus as the song fades to end. The intro solo was released by Steve Vai in his compilation album The Elusive Light and Sound, Vol. 1, along with all of the other small pieces performed by him during the movie. Pieced together versions featuring Steve Vai's intro have been made by fans. "Dream of a New Day" was previously released on Richie Kotzen's 1990 album Fever Dream. "Tommy the Cat" was previously released on Primus' album Sailing the Seas of Cheese. In this version, the title character Tommy was voiced by singer songwriter Tom Waits. Notably, the track "The Reaper Rap", a reprise of Steve Vai's "The Reaper", features not only sound bytes of dialog heard in the film, but also dialog from the film's deleted scenes now believed to be lost.  Portions of "The Reaper Rap" are absent in the film during its play and feature sounds that not included in the version that appear with this release.

Track listing

Not included in the soundtrack

Reception 
Janiss Garza of Entertainment Weekly gave the music a B+, citing that the music comes pretty close to being totally excellent.

References

External links 
 Information at billandted.org
 

Bill & Ted
1991 soundtrack albums
Rock soundtracks
Interscope Records soundtracks
Science fiction film soundtracks
Comedy film soundtracks